Biju Toppo is an anthropological and national award-winning tribal documentary filmmaker from Ranchi, Jharkhand. He uses film as a medium for social activism on behalf of marginalized indigenous communities, and teaches video production at St. Xaviers College, Ranchi, Jharkhand, India. He belongs to the ethnic group Kurukh of India.

Introduction
Biju Toppo and Meghnath Bhattacharya belong to AKHRA, a film production house working in the field of culture and communication in Jharkhand, India. Akhra is a pioneering group that has been making films on indigenous peoples' issues since 1995. Its many award-winning films have taken up burning issues relevant to indigenous people's survival in India. On 9 September 2011, the duo Meghnath and Biju Toppo were awarded the prestigious National Film Award by the President of India at a ceremony held at Vigyan Bhawan in New Delhi.

Filmography

Awards

References

Indian documentary filmmakers
Living people
People from Ranchi
Film directors from Jharkhand
20th-century Indian film directors
21st-century Indian film directors
1969 births